José L'Oficial (born 4 November 1947) is a Dominican Republic sprinter. He competed in the men's 400 metres at the 1968 Summer Olympics.

References

1947 births
Living people
Athletes (track and field) at the 1968 Summer Olympics
Dominican Republic male sprinters
Dominican Republic male middle-distance runners
Olympic athletes of the Dominican Republic
Place of birth missing (living people)